Kadamba is a 2004 Indian Kannada-language action drama film starring Vishnuvardhan, Bhanupriya and Naveen Krishna. The film is directed and written by director Suresh Krissna, making his debut in Kannada cinema and features soundtrack by Deva. The film is inspired by the 1974 Tamil movie Thanga Pathakkam.

Released on 16 January 2004, the film met with negative critical response at the box-office. It was a disaster at the box office.

Cast 
 Vishnuvardhan as Madhukeshawara Kadamba
 Bhanupriya as Yaamini
 Naveen Krishna as Rajashekar alias Raju, Kadamba and Yamini’s son
 Rekha Kumar as Uma, Raju’s wife
 Tharun as Sharat Chandra
 Ramesh Bhat as Ramesh, Kadamba's close friend 
 Chi. Guru Dutt as Jaya Chandra, Sharat Chandra's Brother
 Avinash as Deputy Chief Minister 
 Rockline Venkatesh as Rockline
 Srinivasa Murthy as Srinivasaiah, a money lender (Special Appearance)
 Sathyapriya as  Kadamba's teacher (Special Appearance)
 Anantha Velu
 Shivaram

Soundtrack 
All the songs are composed and scored by Deva. One of the songs "Sangathiye" is based on "Oru Pen Pura", composed by Deva for Annaamalai (1992). The song "Chukki Chukki" was partly based on Deva's own Tamil song "Oh Nandini" from the Tamil film Oruvan (1999) while "Baala Gopalana" is partly based on Deva's own Malayalam song "Shyamame" from Malayalam film The Prince (1996), both these films were directed by Krissna.

Deva later reused "Banda Nodamma" as "Gaja Varanda" for Tamil film Gajendra (2004) also directed by Suresh Krissna.

References

External links 

 'Kadamba' - film of Vishnuvardhan directed by Suresh Krishna
 Kadamba review

2004 films
2000s Kannada-language films
Indian drama films
Kannada remakes of Tamil films
Films directed by Suresh Krissna
Films scored by Deva (composer)
2004 drama films